Hungarian or Magyar cuisine is the cuisine characteristic of the nation of Hungary and its primary ethnic group, the Magyars. Traditional Hungarian dishes are primarily based on meats, seasonal vegetables, fruits, bread, and dairy products.

General features

Hungarian cuisine is mostly continental Central European, with some elements from Eastern Europe such as the use of poppy, and the popularity of kefir and quark. Paprika is often associated with Hungary and is used prominently in several dishes. Traditional Hungarian paprika is characterised by its bright colour and distinct heat, differentiating it from milder variations of paprika popular elsewhere in the world. Other herbs and spices commonly used in Hungarian cuisine include garlic, marjoram, caraway seeds, celery seeds and dill seeds. Typical Hungarian food is heavy on dairy and meats, similar to that of neighboring Czech, and Slovak cuisines. Chicken, pork and beef are common, while turkey, duck, lamb, fish and game meats are mostly eaten on special occasions. Hungary is also known for relatively inexpensive salamis and sausages it produces primarily from pork, but also poultry, beef and others.

Bread is perhaps the most important and basic part of the Hungarian diet. It is eaten at all meals, accompanying main dishes. Before the fall of communism in 1990, white bread was a staple food. Numerous other types of baked goods, such as buns and pastries both salty and sweet, often creatively filled, have proliferated in recent years.

Main dishes may "require" a side dish (köret) or not. It is unusual to violate this convention. The side dish is most commonly potato in various styles, but rice or steamed vegetables are also popular. Some foods have a customary side dish (e.g., csirkepaprikás 'paprika chicken' is almost always eaten with small dumplings similar to gnocchi (nokedli), while others may take any side dish (e.g., rántott sajt 'fried cheese'). Some dishes also have toppings or bread on the side considered almost mandatory, for example, the sour cream and bread with töltött káposzta 'stuffed cabbage'.

Recently, Hungarian chefs have become more creative, so Hungarian dishes prepared for tourists may seem unusual to Hungarians who are familiar with more traditional preparations.

Goulash, often imagined as the quintessential Hungarian dish, is not eaten very frequently. Other famous Hungarian meat stews include paprikás, a thicker stew with meat simmered in thick, creamy, paprika-flavored gravy, and pörkölt, a stew with boneless meat (usually beef or pork), onion, and sweet paprika powder, both served with nokedli or galuska (small dumplings). In some old-fashioned dishes, fruits such as plums and apricots are cooked with meat or in piquant sauces/stuffings for game, roasts and other cuts. Various kinds of noodles, dumplings, potatoes, and rice are commonly served as a side dish. Hungarian dry sausages (kolbász) and winter salami are also widely eaten.

Other characteristics of Hungarian cuisine are the soups, casseroles, desserts, and pastries and stuffed crêpes (palacsinta), with fierce rivalries between regional variations on the same dish (such as the Hungarian hot fish soup called fisherman's soup or halászlé, cooked differently on the banks of Hungary's two main rivers: the Danube and the Tisza), palacsinta (pancakes served flambéed in dark chocolate sauce filled with ground walnuts) and Dobos Cake (layered sponge cake, with chocolate buttercream filling and topped with a thin layer of crunchy caramel).

Two elements of Hungarian cuisine that impress foreigners are the various vegetable stews called főzelék as well as cold fruit soups, such as cold sour cherry soup.

Hungarian cuisine uses a large variety of cheeses, but the most common are túró (a type of crumbly quark), cream cheeses, picante ewe-cheese (juhtúró), the most common Hungarian cheeses like Karaván, Pálpusztai, Emmentaler, Edam and Trappista.

There are many smoked pork products. Many dishes get their character from the smoky taste of one or more of these ingredients. A variety of Hungarian smoked sausages, smoked ham, and smoked lard are also consumed without further preparation. These are accompanied with bread and fresh vegetables, are often called 'cold dish', and mainly consumed for breakfast or dinner, but sometimes offered as starter in restaurants.

Pickled (fermented) vegetables are often used. The most common is savanyú káposzta (lit: sour-cabbage, sauerkraut) and soured peppers, gherkins, but a mix of cauliflower, green tomatoes, baby water melon, and other vegetables is also frequent. These are traditionally consumed in the winter and often were the main source of vitamin-C throughout the cold months of winter. Some seasonal, hearty dishes such as töltött káposzta, húsos káposzta and korhelyleves are based on savanyú káposzta. Classic Hungarian restaurants often offer some variations as side dish, a refreshing complement to heavy dishes.

Spices

Hungarian food uses selected spices judiciously to add flavor, and despite the association of hot paprika with Hungary, most Hungarian dishes do not feature hot chili peppers intrinsically, and one may request not to include them in the dishes that use it. Hot chilis are only sometimes given as a garnish in traditional Hungarian cuisine, although dried hot chilis or hot chili paste may be given on the side for added, optional spiciness. This is in stark contrast to other nations associated with the chili pepper, like Mexico or Thailand, which use the hot variety much more frequently and typically also serve it as a garnish. In Hungary, the sweet (mild) paprika is much more common and is featured prominently in most dishes. The use of a thick sour cream called tejföl as a topping is another common feature in many dishes.

In addition to various kinds of paprika and onions (raw, sweated, seared, browned or caramelized), other common flavor components include: dill, bay leaf, black peppercorn, caraway, coriander, cinnamon, garlic, horseradish, lemon juice and peel, marjoram, mustard (prepared), tarragon, oregano, parsley, vinegar, poppy seeds, and vanilla. Less used spices are anise, basil, chervil, chives, cloves, juniper berries, lovage, nutmeg, rosemary, savory, thyme, creeping thyme, and white peppercorn.

History

Hungarian cuisine has influenced the history of the Magyar people, and vice versa. The importance of livestock and the nomadic lifestyle of the Magyar people, as well as a hearkening to their steppe past, is apparent in the prominence of meat in Hungarian food and may be reflected in traditional meat dishes cooked over the fire like goulash (in Hungarian "gulyás", lit. "cattleman's (meal)"), pörkölt stew and the spicy fisherman's soup called halászlé are all traditionally cooked over the open fire in a bogrács (or cauldron). In the 15th century, King Matthias Corvinus and his Neapolitan wife Beatrice, influenced by Renaissance culture, introduced new ingredients such as sweet chestnut and spices such as garlic, ginger, mace, saffron and nutmeg, onion and the use of fruits in stuffings or cooked with meat. Some of these spices such as ginger and saffron are no longer used in modern Hungarian cuisine. At that time and later, considerable numbers of Saxons (a German ethnic group), Armenians, Italians, Jews, Poles, Czechs and Slovaks settled in the Hungarian basin and in Transylvania, also contributing with different new dishes. Hungarian cuisine was influenced by Austrian cuisine under the Austro-Hungarian Empire; dishes and methods of food preparation have often been borrowed from Austrian cuisine, and vice versa. Some cakes and sweets in Hungary show a strong German-Austrian influence. All told, modern Hungarian cuisine is a synthesis of ancient Uralic components mixed with West Slavic, Balkan, Austrian, and German. The food of Hungary can be considered a melting pot of the continent, with a culinary base formed from its own, original Magyar cuisine.

Hungarian meals

In Hungary, people usually have a large breakfast. Hungarian breakfast generally is an open sandwich with bread or toast, butter, cheese or different cream cheeses, túró cheese or körözött (Liptauer cheese spread), cold cuts such as ham, liver pâté (called májkrém or kenőmájas), bacon, salami, mortadella, sausages such as kabanos, beerwurst or different Hungarian sausages or kolbász. Traditionally fresh tomatoes and green peppers (sometimes scallion, radish and cucumber) are served with these when they are in season. Eggs (fried, scrambled or boiled) may also be part of breakfast.

Some types of meat that were commonly eaten in the past (such as beef tongue, disznósajt (head cheese) or véres hurka (similar to black pudding) are now more associated with the countryside as people turn to healthier diets.

Contemporary Hungarians do not always eat this typical breakfast. For many, breakfast is a cup of milk, tea or coffee with pastries, a bun, a kifli or a strudel with jam or honey, or cereal, such as muesli and perhaps fruit. Children can have rice pudding (tejberizs) or Semolina Cream (tejbegríz) for breakfast topped with cocoa powder and sugar or with fruit syrup. Hot drinks are preferred for breakfast.

Villásreggeli or brunch (literally 'breakfast with fork') is a more luxurious big breakfast given on special occasions or holidays. Often guests are invited. Deviled eggs, cold steak, cold salads, salmon omelettes, pancakes, a spicy cheese spread made with sheep milk cheese called körözött, caviar, foie gras, fruit salads, compote, fruit yogurts, fruit juices, champagne and pastries, cakes and cookies may be served.

Lunch is the major meal of the day, traditionally with several courses, but often just one course in modern times. Cold or hot appetizers may be served sometimes (for example, fish, egg or liver), then soup. Soup is followed by a main dish. The main dish is a dish including meat, side dishes and salad (or pickled vegetables - paprika, cucumber, sauerkraut, etc.), which precedes the dessert. Fruit may follow. In Hungary, pancakes (or rather, crepes) may be served as a main dish or as a dessert but not for breakfast. Salad is typically served with meat dishes, made of lettuce with tomatoes, cucumbers and onions, or some pickled variant of them. A simple thin sliced cucumber or tomato salad in vinaigrette is also typical. Salads such as Salade Olivier or potato salad are made of boiled potatoes, vegetables, hard-boiled eggs, mushrooms, fried or boiled meat or fish, in vinaigrette, aspic or mayonnaise. These salads are eaten as appetizers or even as a main course.

Some people and children eat a light meal in the afternoon, called uzsonna, usually an open sandwich, pastry, slice of cake or fruit.

Dinner is typically less important than lunch, and there is no typical Hungarian dinner. It may either be a lunch-type meal, with multiple courses and the same foods one would serve for lunch, or it could be the same as a traditional Hungarian breakfast, with bread, cold cuts, cheeses, tomatoes and peppers as described above. When dinner is an important occasion it will be prepared the same way and with the same courses a full lunch would be. When it's not an important occasion, it's a good time to eat leftovers.

Hungarian meal times are somewhat flexible. Typical times are as follows: Breakfast 6-9 am; Lunch 12 noon-2 pm; Dinner 6-9 pm.

Special occasions

For Christmas, Hungarians have a fish soup called halászlé. Other dishes may be served, such as roast goose, roast turkey or roast duck, cabbage rolls (töltött káposzta). Pastry roll filled with walnut or poppy seed called (bejgli) is a usual Christmas food, and candies and sweets used to decorate the Christmas tree, such as szaloncukor are eaten during all Christmas, when everybody picks them and eats them directly from the tree. In some households, Lentil stew, also known as 'Lencse Fozelek', is consumed to bring good luck and health in the upcoming years.

On New Year's Eve (Szilveszter), Hungarians traditionally celebrate with virsli (Vienna sausage) and lentil soup. On New Year's Day, it is common to eat either lentil soup or korhelyleves, a meaty sauerkraut soup said to cure hangovers.

Easter is considered a huge event (Húsvét) and is celebrated all over Hungary. The families and their friends have the Mom and daughter prepare meals such as Smoked Ham with boiled eggs and small sandwiches and drinks quite commonly to have palinka on the table and then wait for Fathers and sons to arrive and say a poem (Husvéti Vers) and then spray on their hair with a parfum, Once the Father and son water the Mom and daughters known as Locsolkodás. They have a meal a drink then they go to the next family member until they visited all. In Szabolcs County make a special sweet yellow cheese, Sárgatúró, made with quark (túró) and eggs.

Typical Hungarian dishes

Soups

Main courses

Sausage and cold cuts

 Hurka (boiled sausage, three main types: liver sausage called májas hurka, made of pork liver, meat and rice; a liverless variant of the májas hurka called húsos hurka and black sausage called véres hurka, which is equivalent to the black pudding)
 Téliszalámi (or Winter salami, salami made of spiced meat, cold smoked, and dry ripened, the most famous brand made by Pick Szeged)
 Herz Szalámi
 Csabai szalámi and kolbász (spicy salami and smoked sausage, made in the town of Békéscsaba)
 Gyulai kolbász (spicy sausage, made in the town of Gyula)
 Debreceni kolbász (Debrecener sausage)
 Disznósajt (pig cheese, cooked meat, for example, from the pig's head, coarsely chopped, stuffed into a pig's stomach)
 Szalonna (Hungarian bacon, fatback, back bacon rind, has more fat than usual breakfast bacon)
 Virsli (a Frankfurter-like long and thin sausage, consumed boiled with bread and mustard)
 Lókolbász (Horse sausage)

Sweets and cakes

 Dobos Cake (sponge cake layered with chocolate paste and glazed with caramel and nuts)
 Linzer torta (a tart with crisscross design of pastry strips on top)
 Rigó Jancsi (Cube-shaped sponge cake with dark chocolate glaze)
 Gesztenyepüré (cooked and mashed sweet chestnuts with sugar and rum, topped with whipped cream)
 Bejgli (cake roll eaten at Christmas and Easter)
 Kürtőskalács Stove cake or Chimney cake, cooked over an open fire — a Transylvanian specialty, famous as Hungary's oldest pastry
 Angel wings (crispy, light Hungarian Angel Wing fry cookies, a twisted thin fried cookie made of yeast dough, dusted with powdered sugar)
 Vaníliás kifli (vanilla croissant, small, crescent shaped biscuits)
 Piskóta (thin, light, sweet delicate, crispy cookie)
 Krémes (Known as vanilla slice or custard slice, is a custard and chantilly cream cream cake dessert commonly associated with the former Austro-Hungarian Monarchy)
 Rétes (layered pastry with a filling that is usually sweet)
 Csiga (literally snail - a rolled pastry that comes in many different coatings and flavors, usually walnut, poppy seed, chocolate, and vanilla pudding)
 Flódni (cake with four different fillings, which are poppy seed, walnut, apple, and plum jam)
 Képviselő Fánk (Hungarian Cream Puff made from choux paste and filled with vanilla cream. Literal Translation - 'Ambassador Doughnut')
 Kuglóf (Kuglóf cake, a traditional Austro-Hungarian coffee party cake)
 Lekváros Bukta (a baked dessert filled with jam, túró or ground walnuts)
 Lekváros tekercs (rolled up soft sponge cake filled with jam)
 Lekvár (Thick Hungarian jam)
 Birsalma sajt (Quince cheese, or quince jelly made of quince fruits)
 Törökméz (a sweet sticky white nougat paste cooked with sugar, eggwhites, honey, bits of walnuts, spread between two wafer sheets)
 Halva (a Transylvanian sweet confection, made with sunflower seeds, of Turkish origin)
 Madártej (Floating island, a dessert made of milk custard with eggwhite dumplings floating on top)
 Túró Rudi (sweet quark cheese - called túró - filled chocolate bar)
 Szaloncukor (flavoured candies that hang on the Christmas tree, eaten at Christmas)
 Arany galuska (dumplings, or dough balls rolled in butter, sugar, and nuts and packed together to make a pull-apart cake, with vanilla custard)
 Vargabéles (Hungarian strudel or Noodle Pie)
 Eszterházy torta (Consists of buttercream spiced with cognac or vanilla and walnuts)
  (Somló-style Sponge Cake)
 Palacsinta (crêpe-like variety of pancake)
 Mákos guba (a poppy seed-based dessert found throughout Central Europe; consists of slices of sweet(ened) kifli and poppy seeds boiled in milk with butter, often with various nuts and dried fruits as toppings)
 Túrós lepény or túrós pite (dessert bars made from sweetened túró. A variant called kapros-túrós lepény also exists, which has dill added)

Others

 Lángos (fried bread dough)
 Pogácsa (a type of bun, round puffed pastry with bacon, traditionally cooked on the fire)
 Zsemle (round small breads, eaten cut in half, with butter, cold cuts or jam, often for breakfast)
 Fánk or Bismarck Doughnuts
 Kifli (crescent-shaped bread. It can be made plain, salted, or sweet; see picture)
 Perec (Pretzel, salty crispy pasty)
 Májgaluska (small liver dumplings used in different soups, for example, liverball soup)
 Grízgaluska (Hungarian boiled semolina dumplings used in soup)
 Tarhonya (a kind of large Hungarian "couscous", big pasta grain, served as a side dish; also an ingredient of Tarhonyás hús, meat with egg barley)
 Rizi-bizi (white rice cooked with green peas, served as a side dish)
 Vinetta or padlizsán krém (Transylvanian mashed eggplant salad made of grilled, peeled and finely chopped eggplants)
 Körözött or Liptai túró (cheese spread with ground sweet paprika and onions)
 Libamájpástétom (Hungarian delicacy: foie gras - goose liver pâté)
 French toast (literally "bread with a fur", a savoury French toast or Gypsy toast or bread fritter, a breakfast food or sometimes as a side dish)
 Bread - (Hungarian bread that is baked fresh every morning in the bakeries. The traditional form called cipó is big, round and with a hard thick crust. The other bread type is vekni: long loaves with crispy crust, thicker or thinner, like the baguette.)
 Kenyérlángos (smaller piece of bread dough baked in a flat form, often topped with sour cream, bacon and onions; traditionally a snack for children on the day bread was baked at home, now sold mostly on festivals and markets)

Drinks

Hungarian wine dates back to at least Roman times, and that history reflects the country's position between the West Slavs and the Germanic peoples.

The best-known wines are the white dessert wine called Tokaji Aszú  (after the North-Eastern region of Hungary, Tokaj) and the red wines from Villány (Southern part of Hungary). Famous is also the wine called Bull's Blood (Egri Bikavér), a dark, full-bodied red wine. Hungarian fruit wines, such as red-currant wine, are mild and soft in taste and texture.

Hungary's most notable liquors are Unicum, a herbal bitters, and Pálinka, a range of fruit brandies (plum and pear are popular). Also notable are the 21 brands of Hungarian mineral waters (for example, Apenta and Kékkúti). Some of them have therapeutic value, such as Mira.Traubi or Traubisoda, is a soft drink based on an Austrian license produced in Balatonvilágos since 1971.
Before soft drinks became widely available, Hungarians made their own soft drinks called szörp'', which is a concentrate created from sugar and fruits such as the raspberry, currant or elderberry. This concentrate is diluted in either fresh or carbonated water.

See also

 New Brunswick
 Hungarian Food Safety Office
 List of Hungarian dishes
 List of restaurants in Hungary
 National symbols of Hungary
 Romani cuisine

References

External links

Recipes